is a railway station operated by the Kominato Railway Company's Kominato Line, located in Ichihara, Chiba Prefecture, Japan. It is 16.4 kilometers from the western terminus of the Kominato Line at Goi Station.

History
Kazusa-Ushiku Station was opened on March 7, 1925.

Lines
Kominato Railway Company
Kominato Line

Station layout
Kazusa-Ushiku Station has a side platform and an island platform serving three tracks. The platforms are connected by a level crossing. The wooden station building dates from the 1925 construction, and is one of the few stations on the Kominato line which is permanently attended.

Platforms

Adjacent stations

External links
  Kominato Railway Company home page

Railway stations in Japan opened in 1925
Railway stations in Chiba Prefecture